Norfenefrine (INN; also known as meta-octopamine, 3-octopamine, and 3,β-dihydroxyphenethylamine) is an adrenergic agent used as a sympathomimetic drug which is marketed in Europe, Japan, and Mexico. Along with its structural isomer p-octopamine and the tyramines, norfenefrine is a naturally occurring, endogenous trace amine and plays a role as a minor neurotransmitter in the brain.

Some brand names for it include Coritat, Energona, Hypolind, and Novadral.

See also 
 m-Tyramine
 Phenylephrine
 Metaraminol
 Ciclafrine

References 

Alpha-adrenergic agonists
Cardiac stimulants
Norepinephrine-dopamine releasing agents
Neurotransmitters
Phenols
Phenylethanolamines
TAAR1 agonists
Trace amines